Újszalonta is a village in Békés County, in the Southern Great Plain region of southeast Hungary.

Geography
It covers an area of 20.84 km² and has a population of 141 people (2002).

Populated places in Békés County